The ITF Women's World Tennis Tour, previously known as the ITF Women's Circuit, is a series of professional tennis tournaments run by the International Tennis Federation for female professional tennis players.

History
It serves as a developmental circuit for the WTA Tour, which is run by the independent Women's Tennis Association (WTA). There are several hundred ITF Women's Circuit tournaments each year, spread across all six inhabited continents, with prize money ranging from US$15,000 to US$100,000. Players who succeed on the ITF Women's Circuit earn sufficient points to be eligible for qualifying draw or main draw entry to WTA tournaments.

Until 2011 the ITF Women's Circuit was the level immediately below the main WTA Tour, but in 2012 the WTA introduced an intermediate level, the WTA 125K series.

There is also an ITF Men's Circuit, but it only incorporates the lower-level Futures tournaments. Mid-level men's tournaments, equivalent to the WTA 125k series and the bigger money events on the ITF Women's Circuit, come under the aegis of the ATP as part of the ATP Challenger Tour.

In 2019, reforms was made to the circuit, renaming it the ITF World Tennis Tour as a new umbrella name for former Pro Circuit and Junior Circuit tournaments and will serve as the player pathway between the junior game and the elite levels of professional tennis. The launch of the tour is the culmination of a series of ITF reforms designed to support talented junior players in their progression to the senior game, and target the prize money effectively at professional tournaments to enable more players to make a living.

List of events
The ITF Women's Circuit has included:

AAVA Open
Abierto de Puebla
Abierto Tampico
Abierto Victoria
ACT Clay Court International
Advantage Cars Prague Open
Aegon Eastbourne Trophy
Aegon GB Pro-Series Barnstaple
Aegon GB Pro-Series Bath
Al Habtoor Tennis Challenge
Allianz Cup
Ankara Cup
Batumi Ladies Open
BCR Open Romania Ladies
Beijing International Challenger
Bella Cup
Bendigo Women's International
Berkeley Tennis Club Challenge
Biberach Open
Boyd Tinsley Women's Clay Court Classic
Braidy Industries Women's Tennis Classic
Bredeney Ladies Open
Burnie International
Bursa Cup
Caesar & Imperial Cup
Camparini Gioielli Cup
Canberra Tennis International
Carson Challenger
Central Coast Pro Tennis Open
Challenger de Gatineau
Challenger de Granby
Challenger de Saguenay
CIT Paraguay Open
City of Playford Tennis International
Clearwater Women's Open
Coleman Vision Tennis Championships
Colorado International
Copa Bionaire
Copa LP Chile Hacienda Chicureo
CopperWynd Pro Women's Challenge
Danish Open
Darwin Tennis International
Delhi Open
Dow Tennis Classic
Dunlop World Challenge
EmblemHealth Bronx Open
Empire Slovak Open
Fergana Challenger
FSP Gold River Women's Challenger
Fukuoka International Women's Cup
GB Pro-Series Glasgow
GB Pro-Series Loughborough
GB Pro-Series Shrewsbury
GB Pro-Series Foxhills
Georgia's Rome Tennis Open
Goldwater Women's Tennis Classic
Grand Est Open 88
Grapevine Women's Tennis Classic
Hardee's Pro Classic
Henderson Tennis Open
Hódmezővásárhely Ladies Open
Hungarian Ladies Open
Hungarian Pro Circuit Ladies Open
Ilkley Trophy
Industrial Bank Cup
Infond Open
Internacional Femenil Monterrey
International Country Cuneo
Internationaux Féminins de la Vienne
Internazionali di Tenis Femminili Città di Latina
Internazionali di Tennis Città dell'Aquila
Internazionali Femminili di Brescia
Internazionali Tennis Val Gardena Südtirol
Ismaning Open
ITF Athens Open
ITF Indian Harbour Beach
ITF Jounieh Open
ITF Roller Open
ITF Tokyo Ariake Open
ITF Women's Circuit – Baotou
ITF Women's Circuit – Hong Kong
ITF Women's Circuit – Sanya
ITF Women's Circuit – Wenshan
ITF Women's Circuit – Xi'an
ITF Women's Circuit – Xuzhou
ITF Women's Circuit UBS Thurgau
ITK Open
ITS Cup
Japan Open
The Jersey International
Jin'an Open
Jinan International Open
John Newcombe Women's Pro Challenge
Kangaroo Cup
Kazan Open
Keio Challenger
Kemer Cup
Kirkland Tennis Challenger
Koddaert Ladies Open
Kōfu International Open
Koser Jewelers Tennis Challenge
Kültürpark Cup
Kunming Open
Kurume Cup
L'Open 35 de Saint-Malo
Ladies Open Dunakeszi
Ladies Open Hechingen
Lale Cup
Launceston International
Lexington Challenger
Liuzhou Open
LTP Charleston Pro Tennis
Manchester Trophy Challenger
Mençuna Cup
Merz Aesthetics Women's Challenger
Montreux Ladies Open
Morelos Open
Mumbai Open
Nana Trophy
Nanjing Ladies Open
Nature's Way Sydney Tennis International
Naturtex Women's Open
NECC–ITF Women's Tennis Championships
NEK Ladies Open
Neva Cup
Ningbo International Tennis Open
Nottingham Challenge
One Love Tennis Open
Open Andrézieux-Bouthéon 42
Open Bogotá
Open Castilla y León
Open de Biarritz
Open de Cagnes-sur-Mer
Open de Limoges
Open de Seine-et-Marne
Open de Touraine
Open de Valencia
Open Diputación Ciudad de Pozoblanco
Open Porte du Hainaut
Open Féminin de Marseille
Open International de Saint-Raphaël
Open Medellín
Open Montpellier Méditerranée Métropole Hérault
Open Nantes Atlantique
Open Saint-Gaudens Occitanie
Oregon Challenger
Palić Open
Palm Beach Gardens Challenger
Pingshan Open
Prague Open
President's Cup
Q Hotel & Spa Women's Pro Tennis Classic
QNet Open
Reinert Open
Royal Cup NLB Montenegro
RWB Ladies Cup
Salwator Cup
Samsung Securities Cup
São Paulo Challenger de Tênis
Saransk Cup
Save Cup
Seoul Open Challenger
Shenzhen Longhua Open
Siberia Cup
Slovak Open
Smart Card Open Monet+
Soho Square Ladies Tournament
South Seas Island Resort Women's Pro Classic
Southsea Trophy
Soweto Open
Sparta Prague Open
Sportsmen's Tennis Club Challenger
St. Petersburg Ladies' Trophy
Stockton Challenger
Sunfeast Open
Surbiton Trophy
Suzhou Ladies Open
Taipei Open
Tampere Open
Tatarstan Open
TEAN International
Telavi Open
Tennis Championships of Honolulu
Tennis Classic of Macon
Tevlin Women's Challenger
The Bahamas Women's Open
The Oaks Club Challenger
Tianjin Health Industry Park
Torneio Internacional de Tênis Campos do Jordão
Torneo Internacional Challenger León
Torneo Conchita Martínez
Torneo Internacional Femenino Villa de Madrid
Torneo Internazionale Femminile Antico Tiro a Volo
Torneo Internazionale Regione Piemonte
Trabzon Cup
Trofeu Internacional Ciutat de Barcelona
Trofeul Popeci
Tyler Pro Challenge
USTA Tennis Classic of Troy
Vancouver Open
Vanessa Phillips Women's Tournament
Viccourt Cup
Waco Showdown
Waterloo Challenger
Winnipeg Challenger
WSG Open
Wuhan World Tennis Tour
Yakima Regional Hospital Challenger
Yugra Cup
Zagreb Ladies Open
Zagreb Open
Zhengzhou Open
Zhuhai Open

References

External links
Official site

 
Women's tennis tournaments
International Tennis Federation
Tennis tours and series
Recurring sporting events established in 1994